Edward Francis Williams, Baron Francis-Williams  (10 March 1903 – 5 June 1970), known as Frank Williams, was a British newspaper editor, political advisor and author.

Early life
Born in St Martin's, Shropshire, Williams studied at Queen Elizabeth's Grammar School, Middleton, before entering journalism. He worked on the Bootle Times and then the Liverpool Courier, and was convinced of socialism by the conditions he saw. He moved to London to take up a post as a financial journalist on the Evening Standard, but soon moved to the Daily Herald, a paper with views closer to his own.

Breakout

Editor of the Daily Herald
In 1936, he accepted the editorship of the Daily Herald, serving until 1940.

Political involvement
In 1941, he became Controller of Press Censorship and News at the Ministry of Information, and for his work he was appointed a Commander of the Order of the British Empire (CBE) in 1945.  He then became the public relations advisor to Labour Party Prime Minister Clement Attlee for two years, the first person to hold such a position. From 1951 to 1952, he was a governor of the BBC.  On 13 April 1962 he was created a life peer as Baron Francis-Williams, of Abinger in the County of Surrey.

Academia

Professorship
Williams served as Regents' Professor at the University of California, Berkeley, in 1961, and Kemper Knapp Visiting Professor at the University of Wisconsin from 1967 until his death.

Books
He wrote several books, including a biography of Ernest Bevin, and he co-authored Clement Attlee's autobiography. For the UNESCO, he wrote Transmitting World News (1953). In 1957, Francis produced a history of the press, entitled Dangerous Estate, part of which was devoted to explaining the rise and fall in the circulation of newspapers.

External links 

 The Papers of Lord Francis-Williams held at Churchill Archives Centre

References

1903 births
1970 deaths
British newspaper editors
Labour Party (UK) life peers
Members of the Fabian Society
Writers from Shropshire
Commanders of the Order of the British Empire
Life peers created by Elizabeth II